Maximino Rodríguez Martínez (born 1961) is a Nicaraguan politician and rancher. He is a deputy of the National Assembly of Nicaragua between 2016 and 2022. He is a leader of the Nicaraguan Democratic Force organization.

He was a candidate for the presidency of the Republic of Nicaragua in the 2016 general elections for the Constitutionalist Liberal Party.

Biography
During his adolescence, in the 1980s, he was a Contra. During the war he was shot in the head. In that period he participated under the pseudonym "Commander Wilmer".

Between 1996 and 2011 he was a deputy for three terms for the Constitutionalist Liberal Party.

He was a militant from 1997 to 2016; in that year he decided to resign from the Constitutionalist Liberal Party.

References

1961 births
Living people
Nicaraguan politicians
Members of the National Assembly (Nicaragua)